United Nations Security Council resolution 636, adopted on 6 July 1989, after reaffirming resolutions 608 (1988) and 609 (1988) and learning of the deportation of eight Palestinians by Israel in the occupied territories on 29 June 1989, the council condemned the continued deportations and reaffirmed the applicability of the Fourth Geneva Convention referring to the protection of civilians in times of war.

The resolution also called upon Israel to ensure the safe and immediate return of those deported and to cease further deportations of civilians. The situation itself was brought to the council's attention by Syria and the President of the Security Council at the time, Yugoslavia.

Resolution 636 was adopted with 14 votes to none, with one abstention from the United States.

See also
 Arab–Israeli conflict
 First Intifada
 Israeli–Palestinian conflict
 List of United Nations Security Council Resolutions 601 to 700 (1987–1991)

References

External links
 
Text of the Resolution at undocs.org

 0636
 0636
Israeli–Palestinian conflict and the United Nations
July 1989 events